Acrocercops chionosema (macadamia leaf miner) is a moth of the family Gracillariidae. It is known from Queensland and New South Wales, Australia.

The wingspan is about 6 mm. Adults have dark forewings with three white bars across per wing. The hindwings are very narrow and have an extensive plume of hairs along the inner margin.

The larvae feed on Macadamia species (including Macadamia integrifolia and Macadamia tetraphylla) and Stenocarpus species (including Stenocarpus salignus). They mine the leaves of their host plant. The mine has the form of a large blotch mine on the upper side of the leaf. Older larvae leave the mine to pupate in a cocoon nearby.

References

chionosema
Leaf miners
Moths of Australia
Moths described in 1940